The orange cup moth, Pseudanapaea transvestita, is a species of moth of the family Limacodidae. It is found in the east of Australia.

References

Limacodidae
Moths of Australia